Walter Wright (born February 20, 1981) is an American professional boxer. Walter married Melissa Wright on 11/11/2018. They have a daughter named Aya!

Amateur career
As an amateur, Wright amassed a 90-12 record, including 4 straight Tacoma Golden Gloves titles, appearing in the finals of the 2001 u.s. amateur championships, and the quarterfinals of the 2002 national Golden Gloves and u.s. amateur championships.

Professional career
He opened his pro career by losing in his debut to Matt O'Brien by knockout, despite leading on all three cards. Wright then compiled a string of consecutive victories, becoming a regular fixture at the Battle at the Boat series at the Emerald Queen Casino in Washington, culminating in his appearance on the ESPN reality show "Contender Season 2", a welterweight tournament.  Wright was chosen to be on the "Gold Team" for the show.  He fought Andre Eason in the first round of the tourney, scoring a knockdown in the 1st round, and winning the fight 50-44 on all three judges' cards. He lost his quarterfinal bout to Cornelius Bundrage by unanimous decision; in a post-fight interview, Wright indicated that he'd decided to try and out-punch Bundrage, rather than out-box him. On September 26, 2006, Wright faced off against fellow Contender teammate Vinroy Barrett, winning by technical knockout in the 4th round of the 6 round bout.

On the January 12, 2007 edition of ESPN's Friday Night Fights at the Emerald Queen Casino in Tacoma, Washington, Wright squared off against undefeated but untested Dan Wallace, defeating Wallace by TKO in the eighth and final round.

Wright's next fight came on the Contender's USA vs. UK. challenge at the Metro Radio Arena in Newcastle upon Tyne, England. Wright faced undefeated Anthony Small at light middleweight. Wright came close to knocking Small out in the eighth round, but ran out of gas before he was able to do so. Wright lost by split decision ~ 75-77 | 74-78 | 77-76 ~.

3 years later, on June 19, 2010, Wright returned to the Emerald Queen Casino claiming he had never been away from the sport despite not competing, and won a unanimous decision in a 6-round super middleweight bout over Joshua Snyder.

Wright went on another sabbatical from competition for almost 3 years before filling in as a last minute replacement for Joey Spina on March 15, 2013 against Contender Season 1 finalist and former challenger for WBO super middleweight and WBC middleweight titles, Peter Manfredo Jr at the Twin River Casino Event Center in Rhode Island, and losing an over the limit super middleweight 10 rounder. Before taking the fight on short notice against Manfredo, Wright had served as sparring partner for James Kirkland and had signed to fight Omar Henry just before Henry's diagnosis with cancer, passing only months later.

Professional boxing record

References
 Allen, Percy. The Contender: Walter Wright is back ... on screen. The Seattle Times. July 18, 2006

External links

1981 births
Living people
Sportspeople from Seattle
Boxers from Washington (state)
The Contender (TV series) participants
American male boxers
Super-middleweight boxers